Kasper Cichocki (1545-1616) was a Polish ecclesiastic, theologian and polemicist. He served as canon of Krakow and Sandomierz, canon-prebend of Mydłów, co-founder of the Jesuit college in Sandomierz, pastor of św. Piotra church in Sandomierz and one of the town's most outstanding Counter Reformation writers.

Life
He was born in Tarnów to Stanislaw, a middle-class man from the town.

Works 
 Anatomia consilii editi de stabilienda pace Regni Poloniae Iesuitis pulsis, Kraków 1611, published by A. Piotrkowczyk
 Alloquiorum Osiecensium sive variorum familiarum sermonum libri V, 1611, 1614 and 1615

Bibliography (in Polish) 
 Do P. Gorczyna (Gorczyńskiego), Kraków lub Wilno, 1572-1574; do J. Młodeckiego, Rzym: 17 marca i 3 października 1585; 18 kwietnia oraz 16 i 20 października 1586; wyd. T. Wierzbowski Materiały do dziejów piśmiennictwa polskiego, t. 1, Warszawa 1900
 Kwit, Wilno, 14 lipca 1588, wyd. T. Wierzbowski Materiały do dziejów piśmiennictwa polskiego, t. 1, Warszawa 1900
 Materiały dot. zatargu o dzieło Alloquiorum Osiecensium sive variorum familiarum sermonum libri V, (mowa J. Dickensona z 20 października 1615, odpowiedź kanclerza F. Kryskiego z 1615)
 Wacław Urban Kasper Cichocki - najwybitniejszy pisarz kontrreformacji sandomierskiej, Rocznik Świętokrzyski 1993, t. 20, s. 131-142
 Bibliografia Literatury Polskiej - Nowy Korbut, t. 2 Piśmiennictwo Staropolskie, Państwowy Instytut Wydawniczy, Warszawa 1964, s. 90-91
 Henryk Barycz: Cichocki Kasper. W: Polski Słownik Biograficzny. T. 4: Chwalczewski Jerzy – Dąbrowski Ignacy. Kraków: Polska Akademia Umiejętności, 1938, s. 21–22. Reprint wydany przez Zakład Narodowy im. Ossolińskich, Wrocław, 1989, ISBN 83-04-03291-0.

References

External links 
 Dzieła Kaspra Cichockiego in Polona

1545 births
1616 deaths
Writers from Kraków
Canons of Kraków
Leipzig University alumni
Polish Roman Catholic theologians